Koottickal Jayachandran is an Indian actor who works in the Malayalam film industry. He started his career as a Mimicry artist. Well known mimicry artist and presenter of shows like 'Jagathy v. Jagathy' and 'Comedy Time' on Surya TV.

Personal life
'Koottickal Jayachandran was born in Kottayam, Kerala, India. He married Basanthi.

Filmography

References

External links

Male actors in Malayalam cinema
Indian male film actors
Male actors from Kottayam
21st-century Indian male actors
Living people
Year of birth missing (living people)